Delbert Alvarado (born January 3, 1989) is a professional Canadian football placekicker who is currently a free agent. He recently played for the Ottawa Redblacks of the Canadian Football League. He played college football at South Florida.

College career
Alvarado played for South Florida from 2006 to 2009. He was a member of the Delta Zeta chapter of the Chi Phi fraternity.

Professional career
Alvarado signed with the Dallas Cowboys in April 2010 as an undrafted free agent. He was released in July 2010.

He signed with the Dallas Vigilantes prior to the 2011 season, but he was released before the season began. He played for the Virginia Destroyers during the 2011 season.

In June 2012, he again signed with the Cowboys.

He signed with the Hamilton Tiger-Cats in May 2013. He signed with the Montreal Alouettes in June 2013. In October 2013, he was added to Montreal's practice roster. He was released in June 2014.

He signed with Ottawa prior to the 2015 season. He played in five games, making 11 of 14 field goal attempts and four of five convert attempts. He was released on August 1, 2015.

On May 19, 2016, Alvarado was assigned to the Tampa Bay Storm.

References

External links
 South Florida profile

1989 births
Living people
People from La Ceiba
Players of American football from Tampa, Florida
Players of Canadian football from Tampa, Florida
Honduran players of American football
Canadian football placekickers
Canadian football punters
American football placekickers
American football punters
South Florida Bulls football players
Virginia Destroyers players
Ottawa Redblacks players
Honduran players of Canadian football
Dallas Vigilantes players
Tampa Bay Storm players